Anarithma stepheni is a species of sea snail, a marine gastropod mollusk in the family Mitromorphidae.

Description
The length of the shell attains 4 mm, its diameter 1.75 mm.

(Original description) The minute, white shell is particularly beautiful. It contains six whorls , compact, clathrate, with close longitudinal riblets and revolving lirae. Just underneath the sutures the ante-penultimate and penultimate whorls are sparsely spotted with fulvous. In the body whorl the spots again occur towards the middle, but are contiguous to, and below joined with, one large dorsal effusion of the same
colour. The aperture is narrow. The simple outer lip is thickened..The columella is upright.

Distribution
This marine species occurs off the Philippines; French Polynesia, Vanuatu and Papua New Guinea.

References

 Kilburn, R.N. (1977) "Taxonomic studies on the marine Mollusca of southern Africa and Mozambique. Part 1." Annals of the Natal Museum, 23, 173–214
 Severns, M. (2011) Shells of the Hawaiian Islands - The Sea Shells. Conchbooks, Hackenheim. 564 pp.

External links
 MNHN: Anarithma stepheni
 
 

stepheni
Gastropods described in 1897